Marc Fiechter (born 13 June 1975) is a retired Swiss football midfielder.

References

1975 births
Living people
Swiss men's footballers
FC Grenchen players
FC Solothurn players
FC Lugano players
1. FC Nürnberg players
FC St. Gallen players
FC Baden players
FC Aarau players
SC Kriens players
Association football midfielders
Swiss Super League players
Swiss expatriate footballers
Expatriate footballers in Germany
Swiss expatriate sportspeople in Germany
2. Bundesliga players